The 1939 Stretford by-election was held on 8 December 1939.  The by-election was held due to the death  of the incumbent Conservative MP, Anthony Crossley in a plane crash in Denmark in August 1939. It was won by the Conservative candidate Ralph Etherton.

References

1939 elections in the United Kingdom
1939 in England
1930s in Lancashire
Elections in Trafford
By-elections to the Parliament of the United Kingdom in Greater Manchester constituencies
By-elections to the Parliament of the United Kingdom in Lancashire constituencies